The 1997 Fresno State Bulldogs football team represented California State University, Fresno as a member of the Pacific Division of the Western Athletic Conference (WAC) during the 1997 NCAA Division I-A football season. Led by first-year head coach Pat Hill, Fresno State compiled an overall record of 6–6 with a mark of 5–3 in conference play, placing third in the WAC's Pacific Division. The Bulldogs played their home games at Bulldog Stadium in Fresno, California.

Schedule

Team players in the NFL
The following were selected in the 1998 NFL Draft.

References

Fresno State
Fresno State Bulldogs football seasons
Fresno State Bulldogs football